Mopay is a mobile payment platform represented in the U.S. by Mopay, Inc. Mopay and Mopay, Inc. are registered trademarks of MindMatics Group, a Germany-based mobile marketing company.

History 
The brand Mopay was first registered in Germany in 2003 by MindMatics AG. Offering single payments interface between online merchants and their respective end-customers, Mopay was designed as an international mobile payment platform.

In 2009, Mopay became the central product of the mobile payment division of MindMatics Group. In early 2010, Mopay Inc., was founded as the North American branch of Mopay.Mopay was acquired by Boku on October 7, 2014

Product 
Mopay addressed vendors of virtual goods and digital goods. It offered a billing option for small online purchases through mobile operators accounts. Mopay sought to reach unbanked and underbanked individuals who do not have access to credit cards or bank accounts.

By utilizing mobile devices, Mopay was available worldwide. Mopay connects to mobile operators in over 80 countries.  It handles the digital purchases of over 400 customers, reaching 3.3 billion people.

See also 
 Mobile commerce service provider
 Smscoin
 Fortumo
 Zong mobile payments

References 

Mobile payments
Payment service providers
2003 establishments in Germany
Companies based in Palo Alto, California